Montecchio Vesponi is a small village part of the municipality of Castiglion Fiorentino, province of Arezzo. Located 4 km south of Castiglion Fiorentino, lies in a hill at the bottom of Chio valley, 364 m above sea level, there resides 1200 inhabitants.

History 

The first dwellings on Montecchio hill date back to etrush-Roman era, a pagan sanctuary might have been built there. Around the 9th century the castle was built, part of the fee of the Marchiones family and related to Farneta abbey. Other related feudals were the Orselli and Panzoni of Cortona or the Da Vitiano.
At the beginning of 13th century it became allied to the municipality of Arezzo and the castles of Mammi and Monticello.
In around 1234 it was bought by the municipality of Arezzo which settled more people there, made it a municipality under its influence and a stronghold against Castiglion Fiorentino and Cortona.

In 1281 Arezzo enlarged the castle walls completing the fortress which is visible today, making it is similar to Montecolognola and Monteriggioni, and settled families in the interior.
In 1289 after the defeat suffered by Arezzo in the battle of Campaldino it passed to Florence. It switched back to Arezzo in 1303 and at the beginning of the 14th century was a stronghold against Perugia.

In around 1383,the Arezzo military being weak and without control of its territory, the castle was occupied by John Hawkwood, known in Italy as "Giovanni Acuto", who settled there. Upon his death (1394) Montecchio became again the property of the municipality of Florence and was used by florentine administrators.

It was mede part of the Castiglion Fiorentino municipality in 1774 with administrative reform of Leopold II, Duke of Tuscany.

In the 19th century the castle, formerly subdivided in many small properties, was bought by a Servadio banker who started restoration work. It was later sold to the Budini-Gattai family which restored the tower and continued consolidating the walls. It was then abandoned. It became the property of countess Orietta Floridi.

Pictures

Bibliografia
 Giuseppe Ghizzi, Cenni storici sopra il Castello di Montecchio Vesponi e suo Comune, Castiglion Fiorentino, 1874.
 Santino Gallorini, Montecchio Vesponi, un territorio, un castello e una comunità, Cortona, Calosci, 1993.

External links
 Official website of Montecchio Vesponi castle;

Province of Arezzo